Playland Park was an amusement park located in Houston, Texas operating between 1940 and 1967. Louis Slusky opened Playland Park circa 1940 at 9200 South Main. It is popularly remembered for its wooden roller coaster, The Skyrocket. Texas' first elevated monorail train (1956) briefly operated near the park. Next to the park was an adjoining stock-car race track known as Playland Speedway. Slusky also facilitated the miniature children’s train located in Houston’s Hermann Park. This train may have originated from Playland Park. Playland Park closed in 1967.

Playland Park, Houston should not be confused with the Playland Park located in San Antonio, Texas which started around the same time and later had a wooden roller coaster similarly named The Rocket.

The Skyrocket

The Skyrocket was a wooden roller coaster relocated to Playland Park and opened on September, 1941. The original construction cost (1924) was $75,000. The relocation from Luna Park to Playland Park is believed to be the last Roller Coaster project John A. Miller was involved with. Miller died in Houston in 1941 while working on this project. 

The roller coaster, now claiming to be the largest in the South, appears to have been operational until some time between 1962 and 1964. By 1964 the roller coaster was partially removed and no longer operational. This was to make room for a new large building behind the park where the race track was formerly located. The remainder of the roller coaster was torn down after the park finally closed.

Playland Speedway
 
The race track started ca. 1948. Various races and demolition derbies were held at the track. Local racing talent A. J. Foyt raced there. In 1959 a race car crashed through a fence killing three people including co-owner Sam Slusky. Within a few years of the crash, the race track closed. Many speculate the fatalities contributed to this decision. By 1962 the grand stands were removed and by 1964 a new building was constructed where the track once existed. Alternate names include Playland Park Speedway and Playland Park Stadium.

Closure
 
The park closed in 1967, just prior to AstroWorld opening in Houston in 1968.  Prior to closure, the race track was long gone and the roller coaster had ceased to operate. By 1973, the location was empty. Years later it was eventually redeveloped as retail space and apartments. In the early 1970s, nearby AstroWorld considered purchasing and relocating an existing wooden roller coaster to that park but from Coney Island. Ultimately AstroWorld built its own wooden roller coaster, the Texas Cyclone which opened in 1976.

See also
List of abandoned amusement parks
Luna Park, Houston
Six Flags AstroWorld
Playland Park (San Antonio, Texas)

References

External links
Family Behind Playland Park
Houston Luna Park Giant Skyrocket

Buildings and structures in Houston
Amusement parks in Texas
1940 establishments in Texas
Defunct amusement parks in Texas
1967 disestablishments in Texas